Benoit is an unincorporated community in Polk County, Minnesota, United States.

Notes

Unincorporated communities in Polk County, Minnesota
Unincorporated communities in Minnesota